Lochailort railway station is a railway station serving the village of Lochailort in the Highland Council area in Scotland. This station is on the West Highland Line, between Glenfinnan and Beasdale,  from the former Banavie Junction. ScotRail manage the station and operate all services.

History 

Lochailort station was opened on 1 April 1901 when the Mallaig Extension Railway opened.

The station was constructed with two platforms and was an electric token block post, working to Glenfinnan on one side and Arisaig on the other, until the Up loop was lifted in 1966. The loops were lengthened during the Second World War and a new brick signal box erected, the foundations of which now can still be seen at the Arisaig end of the single platform now in use. The second platform fell into disuse in the 1970s.

A camping coach was positioned here by the Scottish Region from 1960 to 1965, the first year a standard camping coach was used, then it was replaced with a Pullman camping coach.

Facilities 
The facilities here are very basic, consisting of just a shelter, a bench, a help point, some bike racks and a small car park. The station is step-free. As there are no facilities to purchase tickets, passengers must buy one in advance, or from the guard on the train.

Passenger volume 

The statistics cover twelve month periods that start in April.

Services 
Four services call here on request each way on weekdays and Saturdays, and three each way on Sundays.

References

Bibliography

External links

 Video footage & history of Lochailort railway station
 RAILSCOT on Mallaig Extension Railway
 Video of Inverailort House

Railway stations in Highland (council area)
Former North British Railway stations
Railway stations in Great Britain opened in 1901
Railway stations served by ScotRail
Railway request stops in Great Britain